The Hôtel de Vendôme is a five-star hotel situated at 1 Place Vendôme in the 1st arrondissement of Paris. Founded in 1858, it is located at the southern entrance to the Place Vendôme, on the northwest corner of the intersection of the Rue Saint-Honoré and the Rue Place Vendôme.

History

The hotel occupies a former hôtel particulier, the Hôtel Batailhe de Francès, built in 1723 by Pierre Perrin, secrétaire du roi, and the architect . Constructed behind the uniform façades designed by Jules Hardouin-Mansart for the Place Vendôme, the hôtel  itself was designed by Mollet. Perrin lived there until 1729, and in 1736 his heirs sold it to the munitioner and Receiver General of Alsace, Jean Fauste de Batailhe de Francès. It became the Hôtel d'Affry in 1787. From 1842 to 1843, it was the Texas embassy. By treaty of 1839, France had become the first nation to recognize the Republic of Texas (1836–1845). A plaque to the right of the main entrance commemorates the event. The façade and the roof of the building on the Place Vendôme were classified as monuments historiques on 17 May 1930.

The hotel
The Hôtel Batailhe de Francès was combined with the neighbouring building at 358 Rue Saint-Honoré in the early 19th century, and the merged buildings became a hotel in 1858. In 2004, Chopard, a retailer of luxury watches and jewellery, opened a boutique on the ground floor of the hotel with an entrance on the Rue Saint-Honoré. In 2014 Chopard purchased the entire hotel from its previous owner, the UHP (Union Hôtelière Parisienne). The hotel is currently closed for renovation and is scheduled to reopen in autumn 2022.

Gallery

Notes

Bibliography
 Ziskin, Rochelle (1999). The Place Vendôme: Architecture and Social Mobility in Eighteenth-Century Paris. Cambridge: Cambridge University Press. .

Vendome Paris
Vendome Paris
1858 establishments in France
Vendome
Buildings and structures in the 1st arrondissement of Paris
Houses completed in 1723
Ancien Régime French architecture